Joel Dahmen (born November 11, 1987) is an American professional golfer.

Amateur career
Born and raised in Clarkston, Washington, Dahmen was a two-time Washington Interscholastic Activities Association 3A state golf champion at Clarkston High School. He played one year of college golf at the University of Washington in Seattle.

Professional career
Dahmen played on PGA Tour Canada from 2010 to 2013 without much success. In 2014, however, he won twice and won the Order of Merit to gain his Web.com Tour card for 2015. He also played three events on PGA Tour Latinoamérica in late 2014, finishing tied for second in two of them.

On the Web.com Tour in 2015, Dahmen made the cut in 12 of 25 events, including three top-10 finishes. He advanced to the Web.com Tour Finals but failed to earn a PGA Tour card. Returning to the Web.com Tour in 2016, he made 13 cuts in 20 events in the regular season including two tied for third finishes. He earned his PGA Tour card for 2017 by finishing 25th on the money list by $975.

On the 2016–17 PGA Tour season, Dahmen finished 176 in the FedEx Cup rankings with his best finish being a T9. He finished 24th in the Web.com Tour Finals and regained his PGA Tour card for the 2017–18 season.

At the 2019 Wells Fargo Championship, Dahmen finished second to Max Homa, who got his first career PGA Tour win by 3 strokes.

In March 2021, Dahmen won his first PGA Tour title at the Corales Puntacana Resort and Club Championship in the Dominican Republic.

Personal life
Dahmen previously suffered from testicular cancer. In December 2018, it was announced that he is married to food blogger Lona Skutt, whom he has dated since 2012.

Dahmen appears in the sports documentary series Full Swing, which premiered on Netflix on February 15, 2023.

Professional wins (3)

PGA Tour wins (1)

PGA Tour Canada wins (2)

Results in major championships
Results not in chronological order in 2020.

CUT = missed the half-way cut
"T" = tied
NT = No tournament due to COVID-19 pandemic

Results in The Players Championship

CUT = missed the halfway cut
"T" indicates a tie for a place
C = Canceled after the first round due to the COVID-19 pandemic

Results in World Golf Championships

1Cancelled due to COVID-19 pandemic

NT = No tournament
"T" = Tied

See also
2016 Web.com Tour Finals graduates
2017 Web.com Tour Finals graduates

References

External links

American male golfers
Washington Huskies men's golfers
PGA Tour golfers
Korn Ferry Tour graduates
People from Clarkston, Washington
1987 births
Living people